Gregory Q. Brown (born 1960) is an American businessman. He has been chairman and chief executive officer of Motorola Solutions since 2008.

Education
Brown graduated from Rutgers’ Livingston College (now part of Rutgers’ School of Arts and Sciences), where he received a Bachelor of Science in Economics in 1982.
He graduated from Highland Park High School.

Career

Brown is chairman and chief executive officer of Motorola Solutions, which provides land mobile radio communications, video security & access control and command center software for public safety and commercial enterprises.  

He was the Chairman and CEO for San Francisco-based network management software company Micromuse (acquired by IBM) for four years until his resignation in December 2002

Brown joined Motorola Solutions in 2004, he has been CEO since January 2008 and is the company’s longest-serving CEO, after the founder Paul Galvin and his son Bob.

Brown serves on the board of Rutgers University, where he chairs the Committee on Intercollegiate Athletics. He also serves as the Navy SEAL Foundation Midwest Event Chairman and is a member of the Business Council and the Business Roundtable.

Brown has served on the boards of Xerox, Cisco Systems and RR Donnelley. He also served as the Chairman of the Federal Reserve Bank of Chicago and the Chairman of the Rutgers University Board of Governors.

Brown has served two American presidents as part of President Obama’s Management Advisory Board and President George W. Bush’s National Security Telecommunications Advisory Committee.

He earned an honorary Doctor of Humane Letters from Rutgers University.

Personal life
Brown and his wife, Anna, have two children, Megan and Troy.

References

American chief executives
1960 births
Living people
Rutgers University alumni
Businesspeople from Chicago
American chief operating officers
American chief executives of Fortune 500 companies